The Wasatch Range or Wasatch Mountains is a mountain range in the western United States.

Wasatch may also refer to:

Places 
 Wasatch Back, a region in northern Utah that is immediately east of the Wasatch Range
 Wasatch County, Utah, a county in north central Utah
 Wasatch Front, a region in northern Utah that is immediately west of the Wasatch Range
 Wasatch National Forest, a former National Forest in northern Utah
 Wasatch-Cache National Forest or Uinta-Wasatch-Cache National Forest, combined National Forest
 Wasatch Formation, a geologic formation in Wyoming
 Wasatch Mountain (Colorado), a summit near Telluride, Colorado
 Wasatch Plateau, a plateau in central Utah, part of the Colorado Plateau
 Wahsatch, Utah, a ghost town in Summit County, Utah

Other uses 
 Wasatch Wave, a weekly newspaper in Heber City, Utah, started in 1889
 Wasatch Academy a boarding school in Mount Pleasant, Utah
 Aviation call sign for the former Morris Air Service

See also
 Wasatch desertparsley (Lomatium bicolor), an herb of the family Apiaceae
 Wasatch fleabane (Erigeron arenarioides), a species of flowering plant in the daisy family
 
 
 Wasatch Elementary (disambiguation)